Riddhi Kumar is an Indian actress who primarily works in Telugu films. She made her acting debut with the Telugu film Lover (2018). She then made her Malayalam debut with Pranaya Meenukalude Kadal (2019) and Marathi debut with Dandam (2019). 

Kumar made her web debut with Candy (2021) and also appeared in the series Human (2022).

Early life
Kumar was born in Shirdi, Maharashta. Her father is in the Indian Army. She completed her graduation with Bachelors in Philosophy.

Career
Kumar made her acting debut in 2018 with the Telugu film Lover opposite Raj Tarun. The film received mixed to negative reviews. The same year, she appeared in the telugu film Anaganaga O Premakatha opposite Viraj Ashwin. It received negative reviews.

In 2019, she made her Malayalam film debut with Pranaya Meenukalude Kadal alongside Vinayakan and Dileesh Pothan. She also made her Marathi film debut in 2019 with Dandam  opposite Sangram Chaughule. It received mixed reviews.

Kumar made her web debut with the Hindi series Candy alongside Ronit Roy and Richa Chaddha. In 2022, she appeared in the Hindi series Human alongside Shefali Shah and Kirti Kulhari.

She then appeared in the 2022 Telugu-Hindi bilingual Radhe Shyam alongside Prabhas. The film received mixed reviews and was a box office bomb. 

Kumar will next appear in the Hindi web series Crash Course alongside Annu Kapoor. She will also appear in the Malayalam film Chethi Mandaram Thulasi opposite Sunny Wayne.

Filmography

Films

Web series

References

External links

Year of birth missing (living people)
Living people
Indian film actresses
21st-century Indian actresses
Actresses in Telugu cinema